Road Runner Express is a steel junior roller coaster at Six Flags Magic Mountain in Valencia, California. On November 4, 2010, Six Flags had an investor meeting webcast where they released the new name for the kid's coaster and location in Bugs Bunny World. By April 2011, the entire coaster has finished construction on site. The ride opened on May 28, 2011, for Memorial Day Weekend.

History

Six Flags New Orleans (2000—2009)

Road Runner Express originally opened at Jazzland in New Orleans on May 20, 2000. It operated under the name Rex's Rail Runner in the Kid's Carnival section of the park.

Six Flags took over the lease of Jazzland in 2002 and changed the park's name to Six Flags New Orleans the following year. The ride was renamed to Road Runner Express in the "Looney Tunes Adventures" section of the park. 

When Hurricane Katrina hit the park on August 29, 2005, severe flooding caused the park and its rides to shut down. In 2007, Six Flags began the process of moving rides from the park to their other properties. For example, Batman: The Ride was taken to Six Flags Fiesta Texas where it was refurbished and renamed Goliath in 2008. In 2008, Bayou Blaster and Sonic Slam were removed and taken to Great Escape where it was refurbished and renamed Sasquatch in 2009. In 2009, Road Runner Express was removed and relocated to Six Flags Magic Mountain.

Six Flags Magic Mountain (2009—present)
Road Runner Express was dismantled and moved in 2009 to its current location at Six Flags Magic Mountain. The ride was due to open for their 2010 season under the name Mr. Six's Dance Coaster in the Cyclone Bay section of the park, however, the opening was delayed for a year.

On August 3, 2010, the Los Angeles Times reported "the junior coaster will keep the current red and black color scheme and stay in the same planned location in the northwest corner of the park but will likely receive a new name and theme." On November 4, 2010, Six Flags announced that the ride will not use the originally planned Mr. Six's Dance Coaster name and theme, but will operate from early May 2011 as Little Flash which is, themed to the DC Comics superhero sidekicks in Bugs Bunny World.

On January 18, 2011, the LA Times reported after considering a new theme based on DC Comics superhero sidekicks, the park opted for simplicity and would name the coaster Road Runner Express. Two days later, Six Flags Magic Mountain confirmed that the kid's coaster would be called Road Runner Express and that it would open on March 19, along with the revamped Superman: Escape from Krypton. However, the construction of the ride was delayed forcing the opening day to be bumped back. On April 25, 2011, the construction of Road Runner Express was complete and was expected to open for Memorial Day Weekend. The coaster officially opened on May 28, 2011. This resulted with the Road Runner and Wile E. Coyote theme, rockets on the roller blade-style train, and Arizona desert background.

Ride

Guests board a train which seat 16 riders.
The background blends in with the ride's Road Runner theming. The station is surrounded by rocks and Acme crates to decorate the area and Wile E. Coyote can be seen standing on top of some Acme crates.

See also
 2011 in amusement parks

References

Roller coasters operated by Six Flags
Roller coasters in California
Roller coasters introduced in 2011
Six Flags Magic Mountain
Wile E. Coyote and the Road Runner